North Hall is located on the campus of what is now the University of Wisconsin-River Falls. It was added to the National Register of Historic Places in 1986.

History
North Hall was built after the Wisconsin Legislature appropriated $124,000 to construct a new building for the school. Enrollment had been growing, making the existing space overcrowded. It was added onto in 1927 and began housing a four-year course for training teachers and became the State Teachers College.

References

University of Wisconsin–River Falls
Schools in Pierce County, Wisconsin
University and college buildings on the National Register of Historic Places in Wisconsin
Collegiate Gothic architecture in the United States
School buildings completed in 1914
National Register of Historic Places in Pierce County, Wisconsin
1914 establishments in Wisconsin